Jeffrey Alan Lockwood (born 1960) is an author, entomologist, and University of Wyoming professor of Natural Sciences and Humanities. He writes both nonfiction science books, as well as meditations. Lockwood is the recipient of both the Pushcart Prize and the John Burroughs Medal. He also serves on the Advisory Council of METI (Messaging Extraterrestrial Intelligence).

Education and career 
Lockwood earned a B.S. degree in biology from New Mexico Institute of Mining and Technology, where he was the 1982 recipient of the Brown Award. He received a Ph.D. in entomology from Louisiana State University, after completing a dissertation entitled The behavioral ecology of the first instar southern green stink bug, Nezara viridula (L.).

His career at the University of Wyoming began as Assistant Professor of Entomology before becoming Professor of Natural Sciences and Humanities, then transferring to the philosophy department and teaching in the Master of Fine Arts program in creative writing.

Lockwood has authored numerous articles, some of which have been licensed by government entities, such as the Wyoming Water Research Center. In 2000, he co-authored Grasshoppers and Grassland Health for the North Atlantic Treaty Organization. His most recent science book, Six-legged Soldiers: Using Insects as Weapons of War, is a historical account of entomological bioterrorism from early days through the present, and the near future. A guest of the world: Meditations is Lockwood's latest book on spirituality under Skinner House Books, a book publisher run by the Unitarian Universalist Association.

Lockwood and other scholars at the University of Wyoming have recently become locked in a debate with university administration, and Wyoming business and energy leaders over what he and others have argued is a clear case of the infringement of academic freedom. According to emails and reports released under the Freedom of Information Act (FOIA), the sitting university President, Tom Buchanan, ordered the destruction of Carbon Sink, an artwork created by artist Chris Drury, after Wyoming energy and business leaders considered it an untoward criticism of the industry that partly subsidizes the university through severance tax. Although Wyoming industry leaders have called for a moratorium on the debate, the university administration's infringement of academic freedom has become the hot-button topic while the university seeks a replacement for Buchanan, upon his scheduled retirement in July 2013.

Lockwood is married, and has a son and daughter.  He is a member of the Unitarian Universalist Fellowship of Laramie, Wyoming, USA. He also appears as a character in Tectonic Theater Project's The Laramie Project and The Laramie Project: 10 Years Later.

Partial bibliography
Articles
 (1987). Probabilities of rangeland grasshopper outbreaks in Wyoming counties. Laramie, Wyo: Agricultural Experiment Station, Dept. of Plant, Soil, and Insect Sciences. OCLC 20379263
 (1988). Impact of sedimentation on the aquatic macroinvertebrates of the North Fork of the Little Snake River. Laramie, Wyo: Wyoming Water Research Center]. OCLC 54467910

Books
 (1988). Biology and recommendations for use of Nosema locustae Canning, a biological control agent of grasshoppers. Laramie, Wyo: Agricultural Experiment Station, Dept. of Plant, Soil, and Insect Sciences, University of Wyoming. OCLC 20975160
 (1997). Ethical issues in biological control. Agriculture and human values, v. 14, no. 3. Dordrecht: Kluwer Academic. OCLC 39233868
 (2002). Grasshopper dreaming: Reflections on killing and loving. Boston: Skinner House Books. 
 (2004). Locust: The devastating rise and mysterious disappearance of the insect that shaped the American frontier. New York: Basic Books.  (Google Books text)
 (2004). Prairie soul: Finding grace in the earth beneath my feet. Boston: Skinner House Books.  (Google Books text)
 (2006). A guest of the world: Meditations. Boston: Skinner House Books. 
 (2009). Six-legged soldiers: Using insects as weapons of war. Oxford: Oxford University Press. 
 (2009). (with William A. Reiners) Philosophical Foundations for the Practices of Ecology. Cambridge: Cambridge University Press. 
 (2013). The Infested Mind: Why Humans Fear, Loathe, and Love Insects. Oxford: Oxford University Press.

References

Further reading
 Drury's artwork "Carbon Sink" was commissioned by the University of Wyoming. After about a year, it was taken down following after pressure from energy industry and political officials.
 More on the Wyoming University decision to remove Drury's sculpture, and a comparison to Indiana University's handling of pressure regarding historical murals on campus showing the Ku Klux Klan's ascendancy in the 1920s.

1960 births
Living people
Louisiana State University alumni
New Mexico Institute of Mining and Technology alumni
University of Wyoming faculty
American science writers
American spiritual writers